Imbo is a railway station in Khabarovsk Krai, Russia. It is located near Uska-Orochskaya.

References 

Railway stations in Khabarovsk Krai